Isaac Arbuthnot Hope (1865–1956) was a British-born Trinidad and Tobago politician and planter who represented Tobago in the Legislative Council of Trinidad and Tobago from 1932 until 1938.

Early life and career
Hope was born in the United Kingdom and moved to Tobago when he was young. He worked as a clerk for a merchant, and later became a planter and owned a general store in Scarborough.

Electoral career

1925 elections

In 1925, the Legislative Council was reformed to included elected members for the first time. The council was expanded from 21 to 25 members, seven of which were elected. The addition of a member for Tobago gave the island its first elected representatives since 1877, when Crown colony government had been instituted. Voting was limited to literate men who were 21 or older, and came with property and income requirements. The property and income requirements for candidates was even higher than those for electors. Only 5.9% of the population met the eligibility requirements to vote. In Tobago, only 547 of 1,800 eligible voters participated. 

Hope ran against James Biggart, a Black Tobagonian pharmacist who ran as an independent. Hope ran as a labour candidate, and was endorsed by Captain Arthur Andrew Cipriani and the Trinidad Workingmen's Association. Hope lost the election to Biggart.

Later elections
After Biggart died in 1932, Hope ran unopposed as an independent in the by-election to fill the seat and was sworn in on 21 October 1932. In the 1933 general elections Hope, running again as an independent, beat J. King.

Legislative Council and later activism
As a member of the Legislative Council Hope advocated for Tobago's interests including the needs for a more reliable steamer service between the islands and an improved wharf in Scarborough. He raised the problematic issues with the agricultural credit system in which planters were able to access loans at 6% interest through the Agricultural Bank, while peasant farmers paid 12% interest on their loans, obtained from agricultural credit societies.

Hope was an integrationist who pushed for closer ties between Trinidad and Tobago. He saw Tobago's problems as similar to those faced by more rural parts of Trinidad, and believed that a stronger central government would be in a better position to address these issues. He supported unemployment relief and the provision of affordable healthcare for children. He served on the board of Bishop's High School in Tobago.

References

1865 births
1956 deaths
Members of the Legislative Council of Trinidad and Tobago
Trinidad and Tobago politicians